This is a list of flag bearers who have represented Bangladesh at the Olympics.

Flag bearers carry the national flag of their country at the opening ceremony of the Olympic Games.

See also
Bangladesh at the Olympics

References

Bangladesh at the Olympics
Bangladesh
Olympic